Keefer Station Covered Bridge is a historic wooden covered bridge located at Upper Augusta Township in Northumberland County, Pennsylvania. It crosses the Shamokin Creek.

It was listed on the National Register of Historic Places in 1979.

References 

Covered bridges on the National Register of Historic Places in Pennsylvania
Covered bridges in Northumberland County, Pennsylvania
Bridges completed in 1888
Wooden bridges in Pennsylvania
Bridges in Northumberland County, Pennsylvania
National Register of Historic Places in Northumberland County, Pennsylvania
Road bridges on the National Register of Historic Places in Pennsylvania
Burr Truss bridges in the United States